Henri M. Robicheau (September 12, 1838 – May 4, 1923) was a farmer and political figure in Nova Scotia, Canada. He represented Digby County in the Nova Scotia House of Assembly from 1874 to 1890 as a Liberal member.

Early life
He was born in Meteghan, Nova Scotia, the son of Bonaventure Robicheau, of Acadian origin, and Celeste Leblanc, and was educated in Clare.

Career
He was involved in the lumber business. He served as a captain in the militia. In 1891, he was named to the province's Legislative Council.

Death
Robicheau died in Maxwellton in Digby County, Nova Scotia.

Personal life
In 1866, he married Madeline Leblanc in 1866. Robicheau married Chantal Robicheau in 1875 several months after the death of his first wife.

References 
The Canadian parliamentary companion, 1897 JA Gemmill

1838 births
1923 deaths
Nova Scotia Liberal Party MLAs
Acadian people
People from Digby County, Nova Scotia
Nova Scotia Liberal Party MLCs